The 2020–21 Irish Super League season was to be the 48th running of Basketball Ireland's premier men's basketball competition. The season was set to feature 12 teams from across the Republic of Ireland and Northern Ireland. In July 2020, it was announced that just for the 2020–21 season, teams would compete in a conference system. The season was set to begin on 17 October 2020, but on the eve of the season opener, all games were postponed indefinitely due to the ongoing COVID-19 pandemic. On 28 November 2020, the season was cancelled due to the Irish government's COVID-19 guidelines.

Teams

League
The teams were split into North and South conferences. Teams were to play two home and away games against teams from their own Conference, and one match against teams from the opposing Conference, for a 16-game regular season. The conference lineups were announced on 7 July 2020.

Standings

North Conference

South Conference

Results

References

External links
"Basketball Sets Start Date for New Season" at sportforbusiness.com

Irish
Super League (Ireland) seasons
Basket
Basket
Ireland